Zapyrastra stellata is a species of moth of the family Momphidae first described by Alfred Philpott in 1931. It is endemic to New Zealand.

Taxonomy 
This species was first described by Alfred Philpott in 1931 using a specimen collected by Charles E. Clarke in Wānaka (previously known as Pembroke) in December. In 1988 J. S. Dugdale placed this species within the genus Zapyrastra. The male holotype specimen is held at the Auckland War Memorial Museum.

Description
This species was described by Philpott as follows: 

This species can be distinguished from other species with a similar appearance as it has a prominent white costal patch.

Distribution 
This species is endemic to New Zealand.

References

Moths of New Zealand
Moths described in 1931
Momphidae
Endemic fauna of New Zealand
Taxa named by Alfred Philpott
Endemic moths of New Zealand